Colton Lee Haynes (born July 13, 1988) is an American actor and model. He is known for his starring role as Jackson Whittemore in the MTV supernatural drama series Teen Wolf and as Roy Harper / Arsenal in the CW superhero television series Arrow.

Early life 
Colton Lee Haynes was born either in Wichita, Kansas, or Andale, Kansas, a town of 900. He has described his parents as "free-spirited hippies." Haynes has five siblings, including brothers Clinton and Joshua, and a sister, Willow. He grew up on a farm in Andale and has also lived in Arkansas, New Mexico, Texas and Florida. He attended Navarre High School in Florida and Andale High School in Kansas, and graduated from Samuel Clemens High School in Schertz, Texas. Haynes's parents were divorced; his father was married seven times.

Haynes came out as gay at the age of 14. He has said that he experienced bullying due to his sexuality, and that he ran away from home for a time due to his mother's negative reaction to it. His father died by suicide during Haynes's teen years, and Haynes was told that his being gay is what drove his father to kill himself.

Career 
Haynes began his career as a model at the age of fifteen in New York City, New York. He subsequently appeared in a Bruce Weber photo shoot for Abercrombie & Fitch. Afterward, Haynes began modeling in campaigns for Kira Plastinina, J. C. Penney, and Ralph Lauren. In 2008, Haynes continued modeling in campaigns such as Verizon and also appeared in numerous magazine editorials such as Teen Vogue and Arena.

He made an uncredited appearance in the 2007 blockbuster Transformers. He also appeared on CSI: Miami and The Hills. In addition to guest roles, in April 2007, Haynes acted in My Chemical Romance's music video for their single "I Don't Love You", directed by Marc Webb. Later that year, Haynes auditioned for the role of Edward Cullen in the film version of Stephenie Meyer's young adult novel Twilight, but Robert Pattinson was cast instead.

In 2008, he appeared on the television series Privileged and Pushing Daisies. He played Scott Holland in the Hallmark Channel film Always and Forever. Filming began in December 2008, and the film was released to television on October 24, 2009. It was announced in 2009 that Haynes had won the role of Shane in the Showtime series Look, based on the 2007 film of the same name. "I play a 17-year-old asshole. The show is very racy with lots of nudity, sex, drugs and real-life experiences that will shock audiences," Haynes said in an interview. The show premiered in 2010 and was cancelled after its first season. In March 2010, filming began for the ABC television series The Gates, in which Haynes portrays Brett Crezski, a jock who begins to turn into a werewolf. The series premiered on June 20, 2010. The short-lived show was cancelled after its first season.

Haynes landed the role of Jackson Whittemore in the 2011 MTV series Teen Wolf, based on the 1985 film of the same name. In October 2012, Haynes revealed he was leaving the show after two seasons, stating "I'm sad that this chapter has ended, but excited for a new one to begin." Beginning in 2012, he was a recurring member on The CW's Arrow, playing Roy Harper, a street thug who idolizes the Arrow and later becomes his protégé, Arsenal. Haynes was upgraded to series regular status on Arrow for season two. Haynes left the series at the end of season three, but made a guest appearance in the season four episode "Unchained".

In September 2012, he appeared in Leona Lewis's music video "Trouble", playing the part of her boyfriend. In July 2013, he starred in Victoria Justice's music video "Gold". Haynes began foraying further into the music industry that same year by covering a song, "19 You+Me", with New Heights, before releasing a single with Travis-Atreo called "Baby It's Christmas". In December 2014, he also made a cameo appearance in Andy Grammer's music video "Honey, I'm Good".

In 2014, Haynes returned to his modeling roots by participating in Abercrombie & Fitch's "Making of a Star" campaign.

Haynes' first credited feature film role was in the 2015 film San Andreas. He followed San Andreas with a role in the comedy Rough Night, released in mid-2017. Haynes featured in the 2018 film Bigger as Jack LaLanne, reuniting with Teen Wolf co-star Tyler Hoechlin. In June 2017, Haynes joined the cast of American Horror Story: Cult. Later that year, Haynes rejoined Arrow, reprising his role as Roy Harper in the sixth season of the show in a guest capacity. In April 2018, it was announced that Haynes had signed to return as a series regular on the seventh season of Arrow. In August 2019, he confirmed he would not return as a regular for Arrows eighth and final season, but added that Roy is "never gone for too long". Two months later, it was announced that Haynes would appear in a recurring role in the final season.

In 2022, Haynes released a memoir, Miss Memory Lane. Elton John described it as a "brutally honest memoir that socks you in the gut with its candor. Colton Haynes is a true survivor and shows us how conquering our demons in life is a never-ending journey."

In September 2021, it was announced that a reunion film for Teen Wolf had been ordered by Paramount+, with Jeff Davis returning as a screenwriter and executive producer of the film. The majority of the original cast members, including Haynes, were set to reprise their roles. The film was released on January 26, 2023.

Personal life 
Haynes has struggled with anxiety all his life. In January 2016, after years of public speculation concerning his "secret gay past", an off-the-cuff response he made on Tumblr regarding a comment on photos that appeared in gay lifestyle magazine XY a decade before was taken by many media outlets as confirmation of his coming out. Not yet ready to speak openly about his sexual orientation, the renewed attention led Haynes to seek treatment for his anxiety for the next three months. He later publicly came out as gay in an interview in Entertainment Weekly in May 2016. Haynes revealed that he had concealed his sexuality based on advice from entertainment industry insiders who told him that being open about the topic would hinder his career.

Haynes and celebrity florist Jeff Leatham became engaged on March 11, 2017. They were married on October 27, 2017. In May 2018, Haynes filed for divorce from Leatham, but the pair reconciled before their first wedding anniversary. However, in August 2019, they reached a divorce settlement.

In November 2017, Haynes was nominated to Out magazine's "OUT100" for 2017 in recognition of his coming out, his "self-actualization" and his professional work.

Haynes' mother, Dana, died as a result of cirrhosis in March 2018. His sister died in April 2020 after a long battle against cancer.

In March 2019, Haynes spoke publicly about his experience with alcohol and drug addiction, stating, "In 10 years, there were maybe 25 days I didn't drink. I remember when I started, it was a couple glasses of wine, and it regressed into really dark times." He recounted going through a treatment program that lasted four months to address the substance use.

Filmography

Film

Television

Video games

Music videos

Notes

References

External links 

 
 

1988 births
Living people
21st-century American male actors
Actors from Wichita, Kansas
American male film actors
American male television actors
American male video game actors
Male models from Kansas
American gay actors
LGBT people from Kansas
Gay models
Male actors from Kansas
21st-century LGBT people